Wymysłowo may refer to the following places:
Wymysłowo, Grudziądz County in Kuyavian-Pomeranian Voivodeship (north-central Poland)
Wymysłowo, Nakło County in Kuyavian-Pomeranian Voivodeship (north-central Poland)
Wymysłowo, Toruń County in Kuyavian-Pomeranian Voivodeship (north-central Poland)
Wymysłowo, Sępólno County in Kuyavian-Pomeranian Voivodeship (north-central Poland)
Wymysłowo, Gniezno County in Greater Poland Voivodeship (west-central Poland)
Wymysłowo, Gostyń County in Greater Poland Voivodeship (west-central Poland)
Wymysłowo, Konin County in Greater Poland Voivodeship (west-central Poland)
Wymysłowo, Kościan County in Greater Poland Voivodeship (west-central Poland)
Wymysłowo, Oborniki County in Greater Poland Voivodeship (west-central Poland)
Wymysłowo, Wągrowiec County in Greater Poland Voivodeship (west-central Poland)
Wymysłowo, Gdańsk County in Pomeranian Voivodeship (north Poland)
Wymysłowo, Starogard County in Pomeranian Voivodeship (north Poland)